Richard Raine Barker (29 May 1869 – 1 October 1940) was an English footballer who played for England in 1895.
Barker was born in Kensington, the son of Henry Raine Barker and his wife Caroline Haynes. His brother was the artist Anthony Raine Barker. He was educated at Repton School where he was in the football XI in 1886.

Barker played football as wing-half on both the left and the right flanks. He made 43 appearances for Corinthians between 1893 and 1899. He also played for Casuals and helped them reach the final of the first F.A. Amateur Cup final, where they lost to Middlesbrough. He was wing-half in the English national side in a match against Wales on 18 March 1895. His strengths were said to be in passing and kicking, but he was too slow to be an international.

Barker was an engineer and manager with the Bromley Electric Light Company. He died at the age of 71.

References

External links

1869 births
1940 deaths
People educated at Repton School
English footballers
England international footballers
Casuals F.C. players
Corinthian F.C. players
Association football wing halves